Thammanampatti is one of the village of Dharmapuri district, Tamil Nadu, India. Thammanampatti is located nearly south side to Dharmapuri. The total distance between Dharmapuri to Thammanampatti is 8 kilometers.

External links
 Thammanampatti's Google Map

Villages in Dharmapuri district